This is a list of active and extinct volcanoes in Tanzania.

References 

Tanzania
 
Volcanoes